Sten Bertil Ingemund Bengtsson (30 January 1919 – 12 April 2000) was a Swedish Social democratic politician, and Speaker of the Riksdag from 1979 to 1988.

He was born 30 January 1919 in Veddige. He moved to Varberg and started working at the Monark bicycle factory at age 15. He went on to become a prominent figure in local politics before he was elected as a Member of Parliament in 1951. He served as Minister of Agriculture 1969–1973, minister of the interior 1973 and Minister of Employment 1974-1976 before being elected as Speaker of the Parliament in 1979.

Bengtsson also performed the duties of Regent ad Interim 2–3 July 1988. When the King of Sweden is prevented to perform his duties as Head of State, for reasons of illness, travel or other, and when no other member of the Royal House, who is in the line of succession, is present within the realm, the Government issues a decree that establishes a Regent ad interim who will uphold the duties as Head of State for the duration of His Majesty's incapacity.

He died on 12 April 2000. He is buried with his wife Anna-Lisa (1919–1991) in Varberg.

References

1919 births
2000 deaths
Regents of Sweden
Members of the Riksdag from the Social Democrats
Speakers of the Riksdag
Swedish Esperantists
Swedish Ministers for Agriculture
Swedish Ministers for Employment
Interior ministers of Sweden